Ruud Heus (born 24 February 1961) is a Dutch former professional footballer who played as a left-back He is the currently assistant trainer of Jong FC Utrecht.

Career
Heus was born in Hoorn. On 23 April 1983, he made his Eredivisie debut with AZ'67, in a 3–3 home draw against NAC Breda. After four years he moved to Feyenoord, going on to play a somewhat important part in the Rotterdam side's achievements in the following decade.

In his best season, 1993–94, Heus scored four goals in 29 games as the team finished second to AFC Ajax and won the domestic cup. At 35, he returned for one final campaign at his first club, appearing in roughly half of the matches as it eventually ranked last then retiring in the summer.

Honours
Feyenoord
Eredivisie: 1992–93
KNVB Cup: 1990–91, 1991–92, 1993–94, 1994–95
Johan Cruijff Shield: 1991

External links
Stats at Voetbal International 

1961 births
Living people
People from Hoorn
Dutch footballers
Association football defenders
Eredivisie players
AZ Alkmaar players
Feyenoord players
Dutch football managers
RVVH managers
Footballers from North Holland